This is a list of honeydew sources. Honeydew is a sugary excretion from plant sap sucking insects such as aphids or scales. There are many trees that are hosts to aphids and scale insects that produce honeydew

Honeydew sources

References 
Apidologie 33 (2002) 353–354  accessed Feb 2005
 Some Ohio Nectar and Pollen Producing Plants Dr. Jame E. Tew Ohio State University Extension Fact Sheet 1998; accessed Feb 2005
New Zealand Honey; accessed May 2005
All about honey;  accessed Feb 2005
New Zealand Honey  accessed April 2007
Spanish unifloral honeys; accessed Feb 2016
 accessed March 2016

Lists of plants
Beekeeping
Insect ecology
Gardening lists
Agriculture-related lists
Garden pests